The Gosport Queen was a vessel owned by the Gosport Ferry Company Ltd. It was built by Thornycroft of Woolston, Hampshire.

History
The vessel was built in 1966 to the exact design to the Portsmouth Queen and was delivered in a green and white livery. Later, it was repainted into the now standard Gosport Ferry colours. The vessel is no longer in service, but use to run alongside the new Spirit of Gosport or the Spirit of Portsmouth. In the early days it was always hard to tell Gosport Queen apart from her twin sister Portsmouth Queen.

The Gosport Queen (Ship No. 4212) was the last vessel to be built by John I. Thornycroft & Company in Woolston, Southampton.

The Gosport Queen spent her final days in service as refit cover and was sold to London based company 'London Party Boats' in January 2017. She will be used for Party Cruises on the River Thames and renamed Pearl of London.

Ferries of England
Gosport Ferry
1966 ships
Ships built by John I. Thornycroft & Company